Arthur Gordon Stubbs (18 May 1904 – 15 September 2008) was, at the time of his death, New Zealand's oldest war veteran. He was 104. Stubbs signed up for active service during World War II despite being too old to serve and having lied about his age (He was 36). He fought in the Battle of Crete where he was taken prisoner by the German army and spent almost four years in captivity before escaping.

References

External links
 The Battle of Pink Hill, Crete, 1941 featuring a short bio of Arthur Stubbs

1904 births
2008 deaths
New Zealand centenarians
Men centenarians
New Zealand prisoners of war in World War II
New Zealand military personnel of World War II
World War II prisoners of war held by Germany